Isabelle Arvers is a French media art curator, critic and author, specializing in video and computer games, web animation, digital cinema, retrogaming, chip tunes and machinima. She is born in Paris in 1972 and currently lives in Marseille. She curated exhibitions in France and worldwide on the relationship between art, video and computer games and politics. She also promotes free and open source culture as well as indie games and art games.

Background
A graduate of the Institute of Political Studies in Aix-en-Provence and a Postgraduate Diploma in Cultural Project Management of the Paris 8 University, Isabelle Arvers specializes in new media since 1993. She wrote her thesis in French on "Digital virtuality as a way to apprehend reality". To better understand new technologies and content of tomorrow, she first worked in the field of special effects and DVD production at EX MACHINA then at DUBOI. She then collaborated to the non profit organization Art 3000, which is now in charge of a multimedia cultural space Le Cube at Issy les Moulineaux. Thanks to this experience she discovered generative and interactive technologies as well as an international network of artists and professionals in the digital art field. She coordinates the International Symposium of Electronic Arts ISEA 2000 in Paris.

Curating digital media
In 2000, she becomes Image content manager for the electronic shop Gizmoland.com, a lab for experimentations with sound, visual or digital artists and a gallery to show artworks in streaming (music, animation, digital art, games) with the following artists : Eric Maillet, Alain Declerc, Philippe Lejeune, Audiorom, David Nicolas, Laurent Hart, Jim Avignon

In 2001, she curates for Gizmoland the Video Cuts 2001, Centre Pompidou. In 2002 she is the curator of Playtime the Gaming Room of Villette Numérique a gameart, retrogaming and gaming room and a net.art gallery on "sound games", 2002, Paris, and of Tour of the Web in 2003, Centre Pompidou, featuring French and international artists, as Vuk Cosic or Miltos Manetas. In 2005, she curates three Web plasticians sessions at the Pompidou center, about machinima, VJ-ing and 8 bit music.

Retrogaming
Playtime is a retrogaming room and a game art exhibition curated by Isabelle Arvers in 2002 for the first edition of the Festival Villette Numérique. This is the first major event dedicated to games and old computer games in a French cultural structure. The idea behind Playtime—the gaming room is to contrast the low-tech aesthetics of the first gaming computers and consoles with high-tech broadcasting devices (screen-walls, interactive installations, giant broadcasting screens and online devices), to enable the public to appreciate the mind-boggling developments in graphics and the technology used in video and digital games over the last thirty years, while they are playing.

Game heroes in retro gaming, is a show curated by Isabelle Arvers in 2011 in Marseille. This event deals with the history of video games through the heroes who have shaped the imagination of nearly 4 generations of players: Pacman Zelda Supemario, Donkey Kong, Sonic ...

Chip tunes
In 2004, she organized a Game Boy music concert with Bubblyfish and Glomag and "High Score", a Game Boy music festival with the artists : Gameboyzzz Orchestra (PL), Bubblyfish and Glomag (US) and Teamtendo (FR). This event is featured in the movie "8 bit a documentary about art and video games", directed by Marcin Ramocki and Justin Strawhand that was premiered at MOMA in 2006.

Game art vs Artgames
She curated the wireless art event Wifiledefrance for la Region Ile de France, where she invited the project Noderunners, a wifi game in the city. She was the net.art curator for the 2004 Banana RAM festival, Italy. She curated the exhibit Gametime, Experimedia, about games, music and cinema, Melbourne in October 2004 and la Nuit Numérique for the 2004 Bitfilms Festival, Hamburg, Germany, November 2004.

Her last exhibition and events projects attempt to portray video games as a new language and as a means of expression for artists : No fun games and the gaming experience, Bergen Norway, 2005; Mal au Pixel, Paris, France, 2006; Articule 3, emerging Swiss creation, Annecy, France, 2007; Playing to real, Meudon, France, 2007, Gamerz 2008-2011, Aix-en-Provence, 2008 & 2009, Machinima screenings, Gameplay & Mostravideo Brasil, 2009, Game Heroes, Marseille 2011.

She curates machinima programs for many institutions and festivals.

WJ-s performances
She is also a WJs and plays live with online creation through the multiscreen environment WJ-S created in 2006 by Anne Roquigny. WJ-S is a software and a flexible public device for web performances allowing WJs (webjays, artists, curators, web addicts, web mutants) to play live with online text, sound and visuals.

WJs take the control of a multiscreen environment and surf at distance in different browser windows simultaneously. WJ-S is a visible and collective experience of the surf.

Since 2007 Isabelle Arvers has been giving Wj-s performances about the relationship between art and video games on the web, about Neen, an art movement that claims that "websites are the art of our day", showing websites of Angelo Plessas, Rafael Rozendaal, Andreas Angelidakis, Mai Ueda, or Nikola Tosic, and she also gives Wj-s performances about psychogeography a situationist concept, emotional mapping and data visualization.

Workshops
Because she believes that machinima are a new artform and a new way of expression, she gives workshops to students and teenagers in Machinima, movies created with videogames and also workshops of WJ-S and how to use this software to create performances using the web as a giant hard disk. The purpose of these workshops is to show that mass media can be used as a tool for creation.

She gives workshops of Pleade, an online archive publishing Open Source application developed by AJLSM. PLEADE helps institutions to put archival finding aids encoded in EAD (Encoded Archive Description) on the Web, by providing a set of tools to build dynamic Websites.

Publications
She writes essays and articles about digital art, game art and machinima in magazines like Amusement, Digitalarti, MCD, and Multitudes. Her last essay, "Cheats or Glitch? Voice as a game modification in Machinima", was published by MIT Press in 2010.

 "This Spartan Life, un machinima au congrès", Revue Multitudes, 2012
 "Penser l'eouvre d'art en dehors de l'économie traditionnelle", Archée, 2011
 "Cheats or glitch ? Voice as a game modification in Machinima", by Isabelle Arvers in VOICE Vocal Aesthetics in Digital Arts and Media, (MIT Press, 2010), edited by Norie Neumark, Ross Gibson and Theo Van Leeuwen
 "Electronic Shadow : Habiter l’image", Etapes graphiques, 2010
 "Game in the City", Interview of Blast Theory, Amusement n°7, 2010
 "Low Rez Stories, kit d’assemblage aléatoire d’histoires du reel", Amusement n°7, 2010
 "Jeux tu perds gagnes", MCD, 2009
 "Player One", Amusement, 2008
 "Let’s think about fun ! ", Musiques et Cultures Digitales, 2008
 "La muséographie au défi de l’immatérialité", Art & Fact n°26, 2007
 "Le jeu vidéo, un moyen d’expression à la portée de tous ? ", ARCADI, 2006
 "Servovalve, doseur de temps et de hazard", ARCADI, 2006
 "Neen ou la communication entre les anges", Sklunk.net, 2006
 "Milk, an artwork by She Lea Cheang", 56K Bastard TV, 2005

Exhibitions
 DIGITAL SALON, Games and Cinema, Maison Populaire, Montreuil, 2011
 GAME HEROES, a retrogaming exhibition, Alcazar, Marseille, 2011
 GAMERZ 5, Brazilian artists, Fondation Vazarely, Aix-en-Provence, 2009
 GAMERZ 4, Aix-en-Provence, 2009
 PLAYING TO REAL, Art and Games exhibitition, Meudon, 2007
 ARTICULE 3, Emerging swiss creation, Bonlieu Scène Nationale, Annecy, 2007
 MAL AU PIXEL, Mains d’Oeuvres, Saint Ouen, 2006
 NO FUN! Games and the gaming experience, Piksel, Bergen, Norway, 2005
 FRANCE NUMERIQUE, Vjing and animation, Bitfilm Hamburg, 2004
 REACTIVATE, Gametime, Experimedia State Library, Melbourne, 2004
 MIND CONTROL, Net.art section, Banana RAM, Ancona, 2004
 WIFILEDEFRANCE, Wireless art event, Région Ile de France, Paris, 2004
 PLAYTIME, the retrogaming room of Villette Numérique, Paris, 2002
 SOUND TOYS, the online gallery of Viilette Numérique, Paris, 2002

Machinima screenings
 Gamerz 8, ARCADE, Aix en Provence, France, 2012
 Gamerz 7, ARCADE, Aix en Provence, France, 2011
 Maison Populaire, Montreuil, 2011
 What is machinima? Festival MRFU, Maribor Slovenia, 2010
 Gamerz 6, ARCADE, Aix-en-Provence, France, 2010
 Mumia, Belo Horizonte, Brasil, 2010
 Gamerz 05, ARCADE, Aix en Provence, France, 2009
 Gameplay, Itau Cultural, São Paulo, Brasil, 2009
 Mostravideo, Belo Horizonte, Brasil, 2009
 Symposium Imagine the Future, Neuchatel, Switzerland, 2009
 Récréations, Scène Numérique, Aix-en-Provence, France, 2009
 Flash Festival, Centre Pompidou, Paris, France, 2008
 Flash Festival, Centre Pompidou, Paris, France, 2007
 Ciant, Cinema Svetnor, Praha, Tchequie, France, 2007
 Animation Film Festival Annecy, France, 2007
 Flash Festival, Centre Pompidou, Paris, France, 2006
 Némo Festival, Invitation of Chris Burke for This Spartan Life, Espace Cartier, Paris, France, 2006
 Web Plasticians, Machinima vs Demos, Invitation of Burnie Burns from Rooster Teeth Prod, Pompidou Center, Paris, France, 2005

Conferences
 " Voices in Machinima as a Situationist Détournement of Video and Computer Games", ISEA, Istanbul, 2011
 « Levitation in Virtual Reality and video games », Ecole d’art Aix-en-Provence, 2009
 « Art & collaborative thinking », Ecole Supérieure d’Art de Bourges, 2009
 « Collaborative thinking, economy, social, politics and art », Haute Ecole d’Art, Genève, 2008
 « Interactivity, creation and video games », Beaux Arts de Marseille, 2008
 « Sound games and interaction with virtual reality », Ecole d’Art, Aix-en-Provence, 2008
 « Network creation and new spaces of exhibition », Haute Ecole d’Art, Genève, 2008
 " Games, Politics Economy and Art", Kunsthalle, Wien, Austria, 2008
 « Machinimas : a new cinematographic genre », Imaginove, Lyon, 2007
 " Video Art at the digital era", 30 years of Videographies, Liège, Belgium, 2006
 « What is Machinimas », Bâtiment d’Art Contemporain, Geneva, 2006
 « Relation between art and video games in France», Digifrance, HTC, Helsinki, 2006
 « To Play in family», Cité des Sciences et de l’industrie, Paris, 25th 2006
 « Games vs networks », Ecole Supérieure de l’Image, Poitiers, 2006
 " Reactivate : Curatorial’s talk", Symposium Game Time, ACMI, Melbourne, 2004
 " French digital creation", School of Visual Arts, New York, 2004
 " How Curating new media", Pompidou Center, Paris, 2004
 " Art and video games", Fine Art School, Dijon, 2004
 " The Web documentary", General Meeting of Documentary, Lussas, 2003
 " Curating new media in a game room ", Festival Transmediale 03, Berlin, 2003
 " Video Games and Electronic Music ", Pompidou Center, Paris, 2002
 " How to distribute short films on the net ", Pompidou Center, Paris, 2001

Selected interviews
"Machinima explained to our grand parents", interview by A Demain TV, 2011
https://www.youtube.com/watch?v=d0X50YNwI0Y

"Interview by the blog Merlan frit on indie games and the IGF Pirate Kart presented at the Gamerz Festival", 2011
http://www.merlanfrit.net/Creer-des-ponts-entre-differents

"Interview for the show Museogames", by Mathias Cena, 2011
https://archive.today/20130129055134/http://museogames.com/?p=963

"What is an artgame?" Interview for the website Culture mobile, 2010
http://vimeo.com/13120499

"Game Art: Isabelle Arvers on the French Game Art scene", Interview by Mathias Jonnson, Gamescenes, 2010
http://www.gamescenes.org/2010/12/interview-with-isabelle-avers.html

"Machinima at Gamerz festival", Régine Debatty, We make money not art, 2010
"I just interviewed the lovely and very frenchy Isabelle Arvers who not only curated a machinima show for the GAMERZ exhibition but is also one of the most respected experts in art and video games, 8it music and free + opensource culture in France."
http://www.we-make-money-not-art.com/archives/2010/12/machinimas.php

"Interview sur les machinimas", Court Circuit, ARTE, 2007
https://www.youtube.com/watch?v=EnrTSI3ob2s

"Internet art, net art, and networked art in relation, Conversations and interviews with curators, artists and directors" By Karen Annemie Verschooren, 2006
http://www.bamart.be/pages/detail/en/1592

"Digital art with je ne sais quoi", Xeni Jardin, Wired.com, 2002
"Paris may be a world art center, but does France give digital art the respect -- or funding – it is due? Ask Isabelle Arvers and she lets out a sigh. "When you say 'new media' in France, nobody understands what you're talking about."
To raise awareness of digital art in France—and grease the wheels for funding—Arvers organized the six-day digital art festival Villette Numérique, which debuts in Paris Tuesday. The biennial event features art installations, an audio art jury competition, concerts, club shows, cinema and video game "rooms."
https://www.wired.com/culture/lifestyle/news/2002/09/55070

References

External links
 Salon numérique, a show curated by Isabelle Arvers, Maison Populaire, Montreuil, 2011
 Machinima programs curated by Isabelle Arvers for the show Gameplay at Itau Cultural, São Paulo, 2009
 Gamerz 05, a show curated by Isabelle Arvers, Fondation Vazarely, ARCADE, Aix en Provence, 2009
 Gamerz 04, a show curated by Isabelle Arvers, Scène Numérique, Galerie Susini, Aix en Provence, 2009
 Mal au Pixel, a French-Finnish festival, a show curated by Isabelle Arvers, Paris, 2006
 No Fun ! Games and the gaming experience, PIKSEL, a show co-curated by Isabelle Arvers and Gisle Froysland, Bergen, Norway, 2005
 Gametime, a game art show, co-curated by Isabelle Arvers and Antoanetta Ivanova, Melbourne, Australia, 2004
 Online gallery on sound toys, curated by Isabelle Arvers for the first edition of the Festival Villette Numerique, Paris, 2002
 Isabelle Arvers website

Living people
1972 births
French art critics
French women art critics
Curators from Paris
Sciences Po Aix alumni
French women curators